Shanghai Translation Publishing House (Chinese: 上海译文出版社) is the largest comprehensive translation publishing house in the People's Republic of China. Founded in January 1978, it is a member of "Shanghai Century Publishing Group". 

Book publishing companies of China
Mass media in Shanghai
Publishing companies established in 1978
Chinese companies established in 1978